Robert Owens Tiernan (February 24, 1929 – October 15, 2014) was an American lawyer and politician from Rhode Island. He served in the Rhode Island State Senate and was a member of the United States House of Representatives.

Early life
Tiernan was born in Providence, Rhode Island and attended La Salle Academy. He earned his Bachelor of Arts from Providence College in 1953 and his Juris Doctor from Catholic University Law School in 1956. He was admitted to the bar in 1956 and began practicing law.

Political career
He began his political career as a Democratic member of the Rhode Island State Senate in 1960 and served until 1967. In 1967, he was elected to the Ninetieth Congress by special election to fill the vacancy caused by the death of United States Representative John E. Fogarty. He was reelected to the Ninety-first, Ninety-second and Ninety-third Congresses, serving from March 28, 1967 to January 3, 1975. He was an unsuccessful candidate for renomination to the Ninety-fourth Congress in 1974.

From April 1975 to November 1981, he was a member of the Federal Election Commission. He served as chairman of the Commission in 1980, and after leaving the Commission he resumed the practice of law in Providence.

Family life
Tiernan and his wife Dorothy A. Tiernan have three sons: Michael M. Tiernan, Robert O. Tiernan Jr., and Christopher P. Tiernan. His wife Dorothy died in 2001.

He was a resident of South Kingstown, Rhode Island until his death on October 15, 2014 at the Philip Hulitar Inpatient Center in Providence, Rhode Island after a brief illness.

References

Further reading
"Ralph Nader Congress Project. Citizens Look at Congress: Robert O. Tiernan, Democratic Representative from Rhode Island. Washington, D.C." by Grossman Publishers, 1972.

External links
 

 Photo of Rhode Island Senator Robert Tiernan

	

1929 births
2014 deaths
20th-century American politicians
La Salle Academy alumni
Providence College alumni
Columbus School of Law alumni
Politicians from Providence, Rhode Island
People from South Kingstown, Rhode Island
People from Providence County, Rhode Island
People from Washington County, Rhode Island
Democratic Party Rhode Island state senators
Rhode Island lawyers
Members of the Federal Election Commission
Democratic Party members of the United States House of Representatives from Rhode Island
Lawyers from Providence, Rhode Island
Ford administration personnel
Carter administration personnel
Reagan administration personnel